Bobby Bloomfield is a dance, rock and indie record producer and audio engineer living in Los Angeles, California. He is founder of The Rattle - studio complexes shared by artists and music startups in London and Los Angeles. He is also a former member of the British dance-punk group Does It Offend You, Yeah?.

Bloomfield's list of work includes writing, production and remixes for Does It Offend You, Yeah?, 50 Cent, Linkin Park, The Faint, Natalia Kills, dan le sac vs Scroobius Pip, Christopher Lee and Vienna Ditto. Bloomfield has also produced music for Audi, La Redoute and Barclaycard commercials  and for the HBO movie Hollywood Flies. He has played in various bands including Does It Offend You, Yeah? and he is a relative of the English labouring class poet Robert Bloomfield.

Pre-Rattle credits
Selected production credits:
 2004: Barclaycard (commercial) – The Key (Writer/Producer)
 2005: Hollywood Flies (film) – (Composer)
 2006 Sixnationstate -Taking Me Over (Jeepster Recordings) - (Producer) 
 2008: Does It Offend You, Yeah – You Have No Idea What You're Getting Yourself Into (Writer/Drums/Bass/Guitar/Backing vocals)
 2009: The Faint – The Geeks Were Right (Remixer)
 2010: Natalia Kills – Zombie (Remixer)
 2010: Linkin Park - The Catalyst (Remixer)
 2010: 50 Cent - Do You Think About Me (Remixer)
 2010: Escape The Fate – Issues (Remixer)
 2011: Does It Offend You, Yeah – Don't Say We Didn't Warn You (Writer/Drums/Bass/Guitar/Backing Vocals)
 2012: Kamikaze Test Pilots – Kamikaze Test Pilots (Producer)
 2012: Vienna Ditto – I Know His Blood (Producer)
 2012: The Adelines – Little Games (Producer)
 2013: The Adelines – Alleyways (Producer)
 2013: La Redoute (commercial) – Bass Is A Rebel (Producer/Writer)
 2014: Audi (commercial) – Goodbye 2013, Hello 2014 (Producer/Writer)
 2014: V&D (commercial) – V&D Festival (Producer/Writer)
 2014: Christopher Lee – Toreador (Mixer/additional production)
 2018: Too Many Ts -  (As "The Rattle")
 2018: DJ Questionmark -  (As "The Rattle")
 2019: Inigo Blue & The System -  (As "The Rattle")
 2019: Calista Kazuko -  (As "The Rattle")
 2019: PENGSHUi -  (As "The Rattle")

References

External links
 Bobby Bloomfield: Official Site
Discogs Rob Bloomfield
Discogs Bobby Bloomfield

British record producers
Living people
People from Stoke Newington
Year of birth missing (living people)